Ballybrown GAA club is a Gaelic Athletic Association club located in Ballybrown, County Limerick, Ireland. The club fields teams in both hurling and Gaelic football. In 2018, Ballybrown fielded teams at Senior, Junior A and Junior B in hurling, while also a team at Junior A in football. Ballybrown's biggest rivals are neighbours Patrickswell, the two clubs sharing 22 senior titles between them.

The club have two pitches, located in the village of Clarina. The pitches are located either side of the traffic lights, one to the north, towards Tervoe and one to the South, towards Elm Park and Breska Beg.

History
Ballybrown was founded in 1890.

Ballybrown are the only Limerick club to have won Munster titles in both Hurling and football, a feat achieved in 2018. Having won the Limerick Junior B City title, the team progressed to win county honors in late 2017, beating Castletown-Ballyagran in a replay. This was the fourth round in succession that the club had advanced via replay. Indeed, the team managed an unbeaten streak, winning City B league honors, County B League honors before winning the City B Championship and County B Championship. All games played in the Munster Junior B competition were played in Knockaderry GAA in County Limerick.

This title added to the Munster Senior Hurling Honours won in 1989 on the back of a successful period where the club won the Limerick Senior Hurling title in 1989 and 1991. After their first county and munster title success of 1989, Ballybrown contested the 1990 All Ireland Senior Club final, losing to Ballyhale Shamrocks (Kilkenny), by a goal, on St. Patrick's Day in Croke Park. Patrickswell beat Ballybrown in their most recent county hurling final in 2016.

Ballybrown have been a senior club for the vast majority of recent years. The men in green and white were relegated from Senior hurling in 2005, but secured their return to the top tier having won the 2012 Intermediate Championship. This followed a number of final and semi final defeats. They've remained a senior club since, contesting a number of quarter finals as well as a semi final (2016) and final (2016).

Ballybrown has enjoyed relative success at underage, reaching Premier finals in hurling, losing to Kilmallock in 2009 U21 Premier final. While in football Fr Caseys defeated them comprehensively in the 2012 Premier Minor Football final.

In hurling, Ballybrown won the 2019 Limerick Minor Premier Hurling Championship,  which added to the U21 'A' title secured earlier in the same year.

In 2020, Ballybrown secured back-to-back Limerick Minor Premier Hurling Championship titles, defeating neighbours Mungret St. Paul's at the Gaelic Grounds.

Honours

 Munster Senior Club Hurling Championship: (1) 1989
 Limerick Senior Hurling Championship: (2) 1989, 1991
 Limerick Intermediate Hurling Championship: (1) 2012
 Limerick Junior Hurling Championship: (2) 1913, 1967
 Limerick Under 21 Hurling Championship: 1991
 Limerick Under 21A Hurling Championship: 2019
 Limerick Minor Hurling Championship: 1977, 1988, 2019, 2020.
 Limerick Junior Football Championship; (1) 1981
 Limerick Junior B Football Championship: (1) 2017
 Munster Junior B Club Football Championship: (1) 2018

References

External links
Ballybrown GAA site

Gaelic games clubs in County Limerick
Hurling clubs in County Limerick
Gaelic football clubs in County Limerick